The ridged-eye flounder (Pleuronichthys cornutus), also known as the frog flounder, is a species of flatfish in the family Pleuronectidae. Its native habitat is the temperate waters of the north-western Pacific, from southern Hokkaido to the Korean peninsula, the Bohai Sea, the Yellow Sea and the South China Sea.

References

ridged-eye flounder
Marine fauna of East Asia
Commercial fish
ridged-eye flounder